47th Street Photo was a pioneer of "the idea of discount consumer electronics retailing in New York." Tourists with a halting English would mistakenly ask for 47th Street Camera. Furthermore, "its reputation spread across the country through a lucrative mail-order business." Thirty years after opening, they closed.

History
"Beginning in 1967, 47th Street Photo helped pioneer the idea of discount consumer electronics retailing in New York." They were "known for being the first with the latest gadgets at the lowest prices." The New York Times proclaimed that "No other store seemed to have so much merchandise and so few displays,"
 resulting in lines: "Any time you come in, you've got to wait."

The store expanded to five locations, but during an economic downturn the 47th street location closed; eventually so did three more.  In 1995 the store's name was licensed for use by another management team; they oversaw what became the company's closing, by which time a geographically not too distant competitor, Willoughby's celebrated its 100th anniversary.

Other competitors of 47th Street Photo included Newmark and Lewis, Crazy Eddie, Trader Horn, Tops Appliance City, and P.C. Richard & Son. The store's founder's problems continued beyond the 1997 closing.

References

1967 establishments in New York City
1967 in New York City
1997 disestablishments in New York (state)
1997 in New York City
Consumer electronics retailers in the United States
Defunct companies based in New York City
Defunct discount stores of the United States
Retail companies based in New York City
Retail companies disestablished in 1997
Retail companies established in 1967